RNA binding protein, fox-1 homolog (C. elegans) 3 (Rbfox3) is a protein that in humans is encoded by the RBFOX3 gene. It is related to the alternative splicing factors Rbfox1 and Rbfox2, but instead of its involvement in splicing, it is most well-known as the nuclear biomarker NeuN.

See also 
NeuN
Rbfox1 and Rbfox2
Alternative splicing

References

Further reading 

Human proteins